A cigar box is a box container for cigar packaging.

Cigar box may also refer to:

Cigar box (juggling)
Baker Bowl a.k.a. "The Cigar Box"
Cigar Box method
Cigar box guitar